The Full-Custom Gospel Sounds of the Reverend Horton Heat is the second album by The Reverend Horton Heat. It was released in April 1993 on Sub Pop.

The video for "Wiggle Stick" was featured on an episode of Beavis and Butt-head.

"Nurture My Pig" and "Wiggle Stick" were included in the Redneck Rampage video game soundtrack. Some bars in the game also have a loop of "Beer:30" playing in the background.

The song "Loaded Gun" was performed by the group in a strip club scene in the film Love and a .45 but was not included on the film's soundtrack.

"Nurture My Pig" was covered live by X-Cops, a GWAR side-project.

Track listing
All songs by Jim Heath, except "Nurture My Pig" by Loco Gringos.
"Wiggle Stick" – 3:00
"400 Bucks" – 3:09
"The Devil's Chasing Me" – 5:21
"Livin' on the Edge (Of Houston)" – 2:52
"You Can't Get Away from Me" – 2:26
"Beer:30" – 3:00
"Big Little Baby" – 2:31
"Lonesome Train Whistle" – 3:22
"Bales of Cocaine" – 2:11
"Loaded Gun" – 4:18
"Nurture My Pig" – 4:00
"Gin and Tonic Blues" – 3:39

Personnel
Jim "Reverend Horton" Heath - vocals, guitar
Jimbo Wallace - upright bass
Taz Bentley - drums
Gibby Haynes - producer
Erik Flettrich - engineer
Art Chantry - design
James Bland - photos

References

1993 albums
The Reverend Horton Heat albums
Sub Pop albums